Splash (sometimes stylized as Splash!) is a yearly academic outreach program by many universities that invites high school students to attend classes created and taught by students, alumni, and local community members. Splash was originated in 1988 by MIT's student-run Educational Studies Program (ESP). Today, most Splash programs are affiliated with and coordinated by Learning Unlimited.

Format

Splash sessions typically span two days on a weekend, with individual classes generally one or two hours long. Class topics are chosen by the instructors and range from discussions and interactive projects to intense academic seminars. Splash emphasizes having a diverse range of class topics, covering a variety of academic fields as well as non-academic games and practical skills. Student attendees are encouraged to take as many classes as they would like.

Larger Splash programs, such as those organized by MIT ESP, involve over two thousand teachers and five hundred classes. Subsequently, MIT Splash has grown in popularity and attracted students from well beyond its local area. To support Splash at other universities and expand student access to educational opportunities, ESP alumni founded Learning Unlimited in 2007. The nonprofit organization provides assistance, including mentorship and software support, that helps new Splash programs start successfully.

Locations
 Splash programs are held at several universities in the US and elsewhere.

Northeastern United States

Midwestern United States

Mid-Atlantic United States

Southern United States

Western United States

Outside of the United States
 University of Oxford in Oxford, England

References 

Educational programs
Massachusetts Institute of Technology